The 2015 bwin World Cup of Darts was the fifth edition of the PDC World Cup of Darts which took place between 11–14 June 2015 at the Eissporthalle in Frankfurt, Germany.

The Netherlands pairing of Michael van Gerwen and Raymond van Barneveld were the defending champions, but they were defeated in the semi-finals by Scotland's Gary Anderson and Peter Wright.

England with Phil Taylor and Adrian Lewis won their third title in the event by defeating Scotland's Anderson and Wright 3–2 in the final.

Format
The tournament remained at 32 teams this year. 16 teams were seeded and drawn to face the remaining 16 teams in the first round. Like last year, there are no groups in 2015 with the tournament being a straight knockout.

First round: Best of nine legs doubles.
Second round, quarter and semi-finals: Two best of seven legs singles matches. If the scores are tied a best of seven legs doubles match will settle the match.
Final: Three points needed to win the title. Two best of seven legs singles matches are played followed by a best of seven doubles match. If necessary, one or two best of seven legs singles matches in reverse order are played to determine the champion.

Prize money
Prize money was raised to £250,000 from last year's £200,000 prize fund. The prize money was per team:

Teams and seeding
There were only two changes from the 2014 tournament. France and Malaysia were replaced with the Philippines and the Czech Republic, who made their long-awaited debut, after having to withdraw from the 2010 PDC World Cup of Darts, owing to adverse weather conditions.

Seeded nations

Unseeded nations (alphabetic order)

Results

Draw
The draw was made on 27 May by Rod Harrington and Mark Paul.

Second round
Two best of seven legs singles matches. If the scores were tied, a best of seven legs doubles match will settle the match.

Quarter-finals
Two best of seven legs singles matches. If the scores were tied, a best of seven legs doubles match will settle the match.

Semi-finals
Two best of seven legs singles matches. If the scores were tied, a best of seven legs doubles match will settle the match.

Final
Three match wins were needed to win the title. Two best of seven legs singles matches followed by a best of seven doubles match. If necessary, one or two best of seven legs reverse singles matches are played to determine the champion.

References

2015
World Cup
PDC World Cup of Darts
Sports competitions in Frankfurt